Vilela (Uakambalelté, Atalalá, Chulupí~Chunupí) is an extinct language last spoken in the Resistencia area of Argentina and in the eastern Chaco near the Paraguayan border. Dialects were Ocol, Chinipi, Sinipi; only Ocol survives. The people call themselves Waqha-umbaβelte 'Waqha speakers'.

The last Vilela people were absorbed into the surrounding Toba people and Spanish-speaking townsfolk.

Dialects
Loukotka (1968) lists the following dialects of Vilela.

Chunupi - formerly spoken on the confluence of the San Francisco River and Bermejo River in the vicinity of La Encrucijada, Valtolema, Ortega, Esquina Grande and Laguna Colma.
Pasain - formerly spoken in the vicinity of Macapillo, Argentine Chaco.
Ocole - formerly spoken between Lacangayá and Laguna Colma.
Omoampa - formerly spoken from Ortega as far as Miraflores.
Macomita - once spoken west of the Juramento River, province of Santiago del Estero, Argentina.
Yecoamita - once spoken northwest of the Teuco River, Formosa province.
Sinipi - formerly spoken on the Bermejo River in the vicinity of Lacangayá.

Phonology
Vilela appears to have the five vowels /a e i o u/ of Spanish and approximately the following consonants:

Notes

References

Lozano, Elena (1970). Textos Vilelas. La Plata: CEILP.
Lozano, Elena (1977). Cuentos secretos vilelas: I. La mujer tigre. VICUS Cuadernos. Lingüística, Vol.I: 93-116.
Golluscio, Lucia A. and Raoul Zamponi (2019). El vilela del siglo XVIII. Indiana 36. 43-68, A1-A56.

Languages of Argentina
Lule–Vilela languages
Extinct languages of South America
Languages extinct in the 21st century